Cobthach mac Gabran was King of Ui Fiachrach Aidhne.

Cobthach's place among the early kings is uncertain. He is listed in the genealogies but there is no explicit reference to him in the annals. His reign lies somewhere between the years after 538 and 601. 

His apparent predecessor, Goibnenn mac Conaill, is given as his uncle. His apparent successor, Colmán mac Cobthaig, is given as his son. The latter was the first king of Connacht from the Ui Fiachrach Aidhne.

References

 Annals of Ulster at CELT: Corpus of Electronic Texts at University College Cork
 Annals of Tigernach at CELT: Corpus of Electronic Texts at University College Cork
 Byrne, Francis John (2001), Irish Kings and High-Kings, Dublin: Four Courts Press, 
 Charles-Edwards, T. M. (2000), Early Christian Ireland, Cambridge: Cambridge University Press,  
Revised edition of McCarthy's synchronisms at Trinity College Dublin.

External links
CELT: Corpus of Electronic Texts at University College Cork

Kings of Connacht

People from County Galway

6th-century Irish monarchs